The 1997 European Promotion Cup for Junior Women was the first edition of the basketball European Promotion Cup for U18 women's teams, today known as FIBA U18 Women's European Championship Division C. It was played in Rabat, Malta, from 15 to 19 July 1997. Ireland women's national under-18 basketball team won the tournament.

Participating teams

First round

Group A

Group B

5th–8th place playoffs

Championship playoffs

Final standings

References

1997
1997–98 in European women's basketball
FIBA U18
International basketball competitions hosted by Malta
FIBA